Smoke deflectors, sometimes called "blinkers" in the UK because of their strong resemblance to the blinkers used on horses, and "elephant ears" in US railway slang, are vertical plates attached to each side of the smokebox at the front of a steam locomotive.  They are designed to lift smoke away from the locomotive at speed so that the driver has better visibility. On the South Australian Railways they are called "valances".

Overview
Smoke deflectors became increasingly common on later steam locomotives because the velocity of smoke exiting the chimney had been reduced as the result of efficiency gains obtained by improved smokebox design, such as the Kylchap exhaust and Giesl ejector.

Styles
Various styles of smoke deflectors have been used by different railway operators. However, many are essentially a variation of one of two designs of Windleitbleche (wind deflecting plates) developed by the Deutsche Reichsbahn-Gesellschaft (the German State Railway Company) between the World Wars: the earlier, larger Wagner-type deflector, and the later, smaller Witte-type deflector, such as those found on preserved LNER Gresley A3 class 4472 Flying Scotsman. 

The Southern Railway in the UK was one of the first adopters and standardised on its own distinctive style where the deflectors only reached to halfway up the smokebox from the running plate.  Wind tunnel testing showed that these less tall deflectors would adequately lift the smoke on the locomotives for which they were designed, without unduly detracting from the appearance.

References

Locomotive parts
Steam locomotive technologies